Fencing was contested at the 2011 Summer Universiade from August 13 to August 18 at the No. 9 Hall in the Shenzhen Convention & Exhibition Center in Shenzhen, China. Men's and women's individual and team events were held in the épée, sabre, and foil categories.

Medal summary

Medal table

Events

Men's events

Women's events

References

2011 in fencing
2011 Summer Universiade events
Fencing at the Summer Universiade
International fencing competitions hosted by China